Abhijeet Saket (born 3 August 1995) is an Indian cricketer. He made his first-class debut for Bihar in the 2018–19 Ranji Trophy on 30 December 2018. He made his Twenty20 debut on 15 November 2019, for Bihar in the 2019–20 Syed Mushtaq Ali Trophy. He made his List A debut on 8 December 2021, for Bihar in the 2021–22 Vijay Hazare Trophy. In a relationship

References

External links
 

1995 births
Living people
Indian cricketers
Bihar cricketers
Place of birth missing (living people)